The Great Tower is a 1921 painting by the Italian artist Giorgio de Chirico, now in the Pushkin Museum. The Russian Ministry of Culture acquired it in 1992 for the National Centre for Contemporary Arts, though the latter then transferred it to the Pushkin Museum in honour of the latter's eightieth anniversary.

References

External links
The Great Tower on Pushkin Museum

1921 paintings
Paintings by Giorgio de Chirico
Paintings in the collection of the Pushkin Museum